Bukovska Vas is a settlement on the left bank of the Mislinja River in the Municipality of Dravograd in the Carinthia region in northern Slovenia. It includes the hamlet of Sveta Jedrt (or Sveta Jedert).

Name
Bukovska Vas was first mentioned in written sources in 1168 as Půchdorf. The name is interpreted locally as referring to former forests of beech trees or to large farms where unschooled writers lived.

History
In the 12th century, Bukovska Vas was a possession of St. Paul's Abbey in the Lavant Valley. In the 16th century, the settlement belonged to Püchenstein Castle and it had 15 farms and a mill along the Mislinja River.

Mass grave
Bukovska Vas is the site of a mass grave from the period immediately after the Second World War. The House No. 35 Mass Grave is located in the woods south of the village. It contains the remains of a number of Croatians murdered in the second half of May 1945.

Church
The church in Bukovska Vas is dedicated to Saint Gertrude. It was first mentioned in written sources in 1278. It is furnished in the Baroque style and has a late Romanesque rectangular rib-vaulted chancel. A Gothic sculpture of Saint Gertrude dates to circa 1440, and a sculpture of the Lamb of God in a side niche to circa 1300.

References

External links
Bukovska Vas on Geopedia

Populated places in the Municipality of Dravograd